Pseudocannaboides is a genus of flowering plants belonging to the family Apiaceae.

Its native range is Madagascar.

Species:
 Pseudocannaboides andringitrensis (Humbert) B.-E.van Wyk

References

Apioideae